Roar Øvstedal (born 1953) is a Norwegian former ice hockey player. He played for Manglerud Star, and won the Gullpucken in 1978.

References

1953 births
Living people
Norwegian ice hockey players
20th-century Norwegian people
Manglerud Star Ishockey players
Place of birth missing (living people)
Date of birth missing (living people)